Gleb Aleksandrovich Strizhenov (July 21, 1925 – October 4, 1985) was a Soviet stage and film actor. Honored Artist of the RSFSR (1974). He was the older brother of Oleg Strizhenov, who was also an actor.

Selected filmography

The Third Half (1963) as Yevgeny Ryazantsev
An Optimistic Tragedy (1963) as   officer 
The Red and the White (1967) as Colonel
Earth and Sky Adventures (1974) as Stas' Father
For the Rest of His Life (1975) as Kravtsov
Okovani soferi (1975) as Kalenic
The Days of the Turbins (1976, TV Movie) as  von Schratt
The Tavern on Pyatnitskaya (1978) as Gremin
The Garage (1980) as Yakubov
A Few Days from the Life of I. I. Oblomov (1980) as The Baron
Per Aspera Ad Astra (1981) as Glan
Teheran 43 (1981) as Simon

References

External links

1925 births
1985 deaths
20th-century Russian male actors
People from Voronezh
Moscow Art Theatre School alumni
Honored Artists of the RSFSR
Russian male film actors
Russian male stage actors
Soviet male film actors

Soviet male stage actors
Deaths from lung cancer in Russia
Deaths from lung cancer in the Soviet Union
Burials at Kuntsevo Cemetery